The Goody's Headache Powder 200 was a NASCAR Busch Series stock car race held at North Carolina Speedway. It was last run in 2004, after which Rockingham was removed from both the Busch as well as Nextel Cup Series schedules.

Mark Martin has the most wins in the spring race with 5. Jamie McMurray was the last driver to win at Rockingham in the Nascar Busch Series. Combined with his 2002 and 2003 wins in the Target House 200, McMurray won each of the last four Busch Series races held at Rockingham, driving for three teams.

Past winners

1983: Race shortened due to crash.

Multiple winners (drivers)

Multiple winners (teams)

Manufacturer wins

External links

 

Former NASCAR races
NASCAR Xfinity Series races